Putteridge High School is a co-educational secondary school located in the Putteridge area of Luton, in the English county of Bedfordshire.

History
It was previously a community school administered by Luton Borough Council. The school was also awarded specialist status as a Mathematics and Computing College. In February 2013, Ofsted rated this as a 'Good School'.

In March 2017 Putteridge High School converted to academy status and is now sponsored by the Chiltern Learning Trust. In 2019 the first Ofsted inspection of the school after academy conversion was rated as 'Good', with the school said to be showing rapid improvement. The school was also awarded the International School Award for 2018 to 2021.

Buildings
In 2019 it was announced that funding and permission had been obtained to demolish and completely rebuild the school site.
The new school build has been completed. The sports hall was completed in 2020.

Academics
Virtually all maintained schools and academies follow the National Curriculum, and are inspected by Ofsted on how well they succeed in delivering a 'broad and balanced curriculum'. The school has to decide whether Key Stage 3 contains years 7, 8 and 9- or whether year 9 should be in Key Stage 4 and the students just study subjects that will be examined by the GCSEs exams at 16. Putteridge had decided to take the latter approach.
Putteridge High School offers Key Stage 3 and Key Stage 4 only. There is no sixth form or Key Stage 5. The school also offers The Duke of Edinburgh's Award programme. All students continued in education after leaving the school. The school maintains German as a Key Stage 4 option, and has a German partner school, the Theisstalschule, Niedernhausen with whom they do regular visits and joint music and outdoor pursuits activities. The link was established through the Comenius programme. The visit in December 2019 was funded by the British Council, and included visits to Frankfurt, Mainz and Wiesbaden.

Key Stage 3
In year 7 and year 8, the pupils follow the Key Stage 3 National Curriculum, They are setted in Maths and English. They have lessons in:

Key Stage 4
The core subjects studies are:

In addition they choose 4 extra subjects, called options, One must be History of Geoography, in order to fulfill the EBACC requirements. The other subjects can varied each year but come from this list.

Incidents
In June 2016 a senior teacher at the school was attacked by a pupil leaving the teacher with brain damage. The incident led to Luton Borough Council being fined £160,000.

References

External links
Putteridge High School official website

Secondary schools in Luton
Academies in Luton